Harriet Baldwin Creighton (27 June 1909 – January 9, 2004) was an American botanist, geneticist and educator.

Background
Born in Delavan, Illinois, Creighton graduated from Wellesley College in 1929, and went on to complete her Ph.D. at Cornell University in 1933.

Career
During her time at Cornell she worked in the field of maize cytogenetics with Barbara McClintock, the pair published a very influential paper in 1931 in which they described chromosomal crossover for the first time. This paper, part of her Ph.D. research, provided key evidence that chromosomes carried and exchanged genetic information and hence that genes for physical traits are carried on chromosomes. Barbara McClintock guided her Ph.D. research.

After completing her Ph.D. she taught at Cornell University and Connecticut College, and then returned to Wellesley College where she taught until her retirement in 1974; taking time from her career to serve in the U.S. Navy during World War II.

Creighton was elected in 1940 a fellow of the American Association for the Advancement of Science.

Key Publication

.

References

External links
 Wellesley Wire: "Harriet Creighton, long-time professor of botany, dies" (January 29, 2004);
 **Kass, Lee B.  2005c, Plant Science Bulletin:  "Harriet B. Creighton: Proud botanist" 51(4): 118–125.  Available online, December 2005: 
Kass, Lee B. 2007a. "Women Pioneers in Plant Biology" - Barbara McClintock (1902-1992)" — American Society of Plant Biologists website, Ann Hirsch editor, published online February 2007
Kass, Lee B. 2007b. "Women Pioneers in Plant Biology" - Barbara McClintock (1902-1992)" — American Society of Plant Biologists website, Ann Hirsch editor, published online March 2007]
 Kass, L. B. and Chomet, P. 2009.  Barbara McClintock, Pgs.  17–52, in J. Bennetzen and S. Hake, Editors, Handbook of Maize: Genetics and Genomics. Springer
 Macmillan Science Library: Plant Sciences - Bookrags: "Harriet Creighton: American Botanist" 
 Kalte, Pamela M. and Nemeh, Katherine H. (2005) "Creighton, Harriet Baldwin (1909-)" American Men & Women of Science: A biographical directory of today's leaders in physical, biological and related sciences (22nd ed.) Thomson Gale, Detroit
 McGrayne, Sharon Bertsch (1998) Nobel Prize Women in Science: Their Lives, Struggles, and Momentous Discoveries Carol Publishing Group, New Jersey

1909 births
2004 deaths
20th-century American educators
American geneticists
American women botanists
American women geneticists
Botanical Society of America
Cornell University faculty
Cornell University College of Agriculture and Life Sciences alumni
Wellesley College alumni
United States Navy personnel of World War II
Female United States Navy personnel
People from Delavan, Illinois
Scientists from Illinois
20th-century American botanists
20th-century American women scientists
20th-century American women educators
American women academics
21st-century American women
Fellows of the American Association for the Advancement of Science